Desulfobacterium catecholicum is a catechol-degrading lemon-shaped non-sporing sulfate-reducing bacterium. Its type strain is Nzva20.

References

Further reading
Atlas, Ronald M. Handbook of media for environmental microbiology. CRC press, 2005. 
Atlas, Ronald M. Handbook of microbiological media. Vol. 1. CRC press, 2004. 
Van Straalen, Nico M., and Dick Roelofs. An introduction to ecological genomics. Oxford University Press, 2011.

External links 

LPSN
Type strain of Desulfobacterium catecholicum at BacDive -  the Bacterial Diversity Metadatabase

Desulfobacterales
Bacteria described in 1988